KCYB-LP (103.5 FM) is a terrestrial American low power radio station, licensed to the unincorporated area of Cypress, Harris County, Texas, United States, and is owned by the Cypress Broadcasting Club of Cypress, Texas.

History
Cypress Broadcasting Club received a construction permit to build a Class L1 (low power) facility off of House Road, near Katy-Hockley Road in unincorporated Harris County, Texas, on February 7, 2014. The facility is authorized to operate at 22 watts ERP, from an elevation of 62.4522 meters height above average terrain.

The construction permit was assigned the call letters KCYB-LP by request on February 15, 2014. The callsign stands for CYpress Broadcasting, the Community served by the facility, as well as the Company name of the owner.

KCYB-LP received an initial License to Cover on October 6, 2014. Legendary Houston radio personalities Jim Pruett of KLOL and Colonel St. James of KKRW were instrumental in launching the new station, as well as working on-air shifts during the broadcast day.

References

External links

CYB-LP
CYB-LP
Radio stations established in 2014
Community radio stations in the United States